Queens–Shelburne may refer to:

 Queens—Shelburne, a federal electoral district in Nova Scotia for Canada
 Queens-Shelburne, a provincial electoral district for Nova Scotia in Canada

See also

 
 Shelburne (disambiguation)
 Queens (disambiguation)